Social Democratic Party was the first socialist party in the Empire of Japan. The party was banned by the government of Japan only one day after its foundation.

The party was founded by Kinoshita Naoe, Kiyoshi Kawakami, Sen Katayama, Abe Isoo, and Kōtoku Shūsui. Kinoshita and Katayama were nominated as administrative secretaries. All the six founders except Kōtoku Shūsui were christians at the time, which influenced the party's doctrine. When composing the platform, the founders took the platform of Social Democratic Party of Germany (SPD) as the reference. It followed an internationalist spirit in its Basic Program, like its German counterpart. The first article of the platform of the social democratic party was "the aim of our party is to achieve socialism (in Japan)".

See also
Japan Socialist Party (1906)
Social Democratic Party (Japan)
Social Mass Party

References

Political parties established in 1901
Political parties disestablished in 1901
Political parties in Japan
Social democratic parties in Japan
Defunct political parties in Japan
Meiji socialism